is a Japanese voice actress and musician. Affiliated with the HiBiKi talent agency, she plays the bass guitar for the band Poppin'Party of the BanG Dream! franchise, which includes portraying the character Rimi Ushigome.

Career
Nishimoto became interested in voice acting after watching the anime Mirmo! in elementary school. She began playing the piano and Electone at the age of three and the guitar at 14, and was a euphonium and saxophone player in her middle and high schools' band clubs.

In April 2013, Nishimoto auditioned for a spot in the Bushiroad franchise Tantei Opera Milky Holmes and qualified for the finals. Although Ayasa Itō ultimately won the role, Nishimoto's guitar playing caught Bushiroad head Takaaki Kidani's interest and she was later recruited for his new music project BanG Dream! as a bassist; at the time, Nishimoto had the least experience with the bass compared to the guitar and piano. Nishimoto, along with Itō and Aimi, comprised the original cast for the first BanG_Dream! live on April 18, 2015, and the three would form the band Poppin'Party with Sae Ōtsuka and Ayaka Ōhashi. In addition to live concerts, Nishimoto's role in the franchise included portraying Rimi Ushigome in the anime and mobile game BanG Dream! Girls Band Party!; certain aspects of her character were also inspired by her real-life personality. A Rimi-based image song by Nishimoto titled "Chocolate no Teion Recipe" was released on June 21, 2017; the single peaked at 20th on the Oricon Weekly Singles Chart.

In 2016, Nishimoto voiced Unne Sonosaki in the Bushiroad short series We Are the Luck & Logic Club!, followed by Amol in Hina Logi: From Luck & Logic a year later. She also portrayed Haru Mikado in the 2018 show Future Card Buddyfight Ace, which featured Poppin'Party's "Saa Ikō!" as the opening theme music. Nishimoto voiced Fumi Futagawa in the 2020 anime Assault Lily Bouquet and its spin-off series Assault Lily Fruits. She portrayed Lulune in the 2021 anime The Fruit of Evolution.

Personal life
Nishimoto graduated from university in 2017.

Filmography

Anime

Video games

References

External links
 
 Official agency profile 

Living people
1994 births
Japanese bass guitarists
Japanese video game actresses
Japanese voice actresses
21st-century Japanese actresses
21st-century Japanese singers
21st-century Japanese women singers